The CITI was a proposed light-rail system that would have served the under-construction Titanic Quarter and George Best Belfast City Airport in Belfast, Northern Ireland. A report revealed that there were not enough people in the city to justify the project, instead recommending the use of a bus network to save costs.

See also
 List of town tramway systems in the United Kingdom: Northern Ireland

Notes

Proposed rail infrastructure in Northern Ireland
Passenger rail transport in Northern Ireland
Abandoned light rail projects in the United Kingdom